Ponnuthurai Nagaratnam Suganthan is a computer science academic at the Nanyang Technological University, Singapore. He was named Fellow of the Institute of Electrical and Electronics Engineers (IEEE) in 2015 for "contributions to optimization using evolutionary and swarm algorithms".

He was selected as a highly cited researcher by Thomson Reuters in 2015 and 2016 in computer science (the World's Most Influential Scientists, 2015). Suganthan's main research contributions were in the areas of evolutionary algorithms, swarm intelligence, deep learning, big data, and pattern recognition. His Google Scholar citation index is more than 24,000.

Suganthan studied at Union College, Tellippalai, Jaffna, Sri Lanka, from primary school until year 12. He scored the highest aggregate of 372 in the 1986 GCE Advanced Level in Sri Lanka and received a full scholarship by the University of Cambridge.

After he completed his Ph.D. degree from Nanyang Technological University, Singapore, in 1995, he served as a research assistant in the Department of Electrical Engineering at the University of Sydney in 1995–96 and a lecturer in the Department of Computer Science and Electrical Engineering, University of Queensland in 1996–99. He moved to Nanyang Technological University in 1999. Suganthan is a founding co-editor-in-chief of Swarm and Evolutionary Computation. He is a member of the editorial board of Evolutionary Computation (MIT Press), and an associate editor of IEEE Transactions on Cybernetics, IEEE Transactions on Evolutionary Computation, Information Sciences (Elsevier), Pattern Recognition (Elsevier) and International Journal of Swarm Intelligence Research.

References 

Union College, Tellippalai
Fellow Members of the IEEE
Living people
Academic staff of Nanyang Technological University
Singaporean engineers
Sri Lankan Tamil academics
Year of birth missing (living people)